A ghost sign is an old hand-painted advertising sign that has been preserved on a building for an extended period of time. The sign may be kept for its nostalgic appeal, or simply indifference by the owner.

History and preservation

Ghost signs are found across the world with the United States, the United Kingdom, France and Canada having many surviving examples. Ghost signs are also called fading ads or brickads. In many cases these are advertisements painted on brick that remained over time. Old painted advertisements are occasionally discovered upon demolition of later-built adjoining structures. Throughout rural areas, old barn advertisements continue to promote defunct brands and quaint roadside attractions.

Many ghost signs from the 1890s to 1960s are still visible. Such signs were most commonly used in the decades before the Great Depression.

The painters of the signs were called "wall dogs". As signage advertising formats changed, less durable signs appeared in the later 20th century, and ghost signs from that era are less common.

Ghost signs were originally painted with oil-based house paints.  The paint that has survived the test of time most likely contains lead, which keeps it strongly adhered to the masonry surface.  Ghost signs were often preserved through repainting the entire sign since the colors often fade over time.  When ownership changed, a new sign would be painted over the old one.

In 2013, conservators undertook an effort to preserve ghost signs in Philadelphia.

In the city of Detroit, well-preserved ghost signs have been uncovered when an adjoining building is demolished as part of the city's blight-fighting efforts.

Gallery

See also
 Palimpsest
 Privilege sign
 Signwriter

References

Further reading
Ghost Signs of Louisville – from the University of Louisville Libraries

External links

Ghost signs from Canada & the US
Ghost Ads at Lileks.com
UK Ghost Signs
Ghost adverts on Heritageandhistory.com
Leading Ghost Signs Article
Facebook page featuring British and Irish ghost signs
Liverpool Ghost Signs - The first British ghost signs book 
Painted signs and mosaics - A record of ghost signs from the UK, France, Germany and a few other countries
American Ghosts - Ghost Signs of the United States
Dublin Ghost Signs - Capturing Dublin's history through its old and fading signs

Advertising by medium
Painting
Signage